Hayley Jones (born 14 September 1988) is a British sprinter. She competed in the 4x100 metres relay event at the 2013 World Championships in Athletics, winning a bronze medal.

References

1988 births
Living people
British female sprinters
Place of birth missing (living people)
21st-century British women